Frank Smith is an American Democratic Party politician currently serving as a member of the Connecticut House of Representatives from the 118th district, which includes part of the city of Milford since 2021. Smith was first elected to the seat in 2020, defeating Republican Erik Smith. Smith currently serves as vice chair of the House's Housing Committee. He is also a member of the House Education and Environment Committees.

References

People from Milford, Connecticut
Democratic Party members of the Connecticut House of Representatives
Living people
Year of birth missing (living people)